Lynn P. Findley (born 1952) is an American politician serving as a member of the Oregon State Senate. He represents the 30th district, which covers much of Eastern Oregon.

Biography
Findley was born in Vale, graduating from Vale High School in 1970 and then from Treasure Valley Community College. He worked with the Bureau of Land Management for 32 years, retiring in 2003. He also has served on many planning and development commissions in southeastern Oregon.

In 2012, Findley ran for Malheur County commissioner, losing the Republican primary. He was appointed interim Malheur County Justice of the Peace in August 2012, following the incumbent's death, and served until January 2013, when an elected successor took office. Findley served as city manager of Vale from July 2013 until January 2018.

After Representative Cliff Bentz was appointed to the Oregon Senate following Ted Ferrioli's resignation, Findley was unanimously selected by county commissioners in the 60th district to take his seat in the House.

Findley was appointed to the Oregon State Senate District 30 on January 6, 2020, following former Senator Cliff Bentz's resignation.

Electoral history

External links 
 Campaign website
 Legislative website

References

1950s births
Living people
21st-century American politicians
American city managers
American justices of the peace
Bureau of Land Management personnel
Republican Party members of the Oregon House of Representatives
Republican Party Oregon state senators
People from Vale, Oregon
Treasure Valley Community College alumni